Khardo Hermitage is a historical hermitage in Tibet, belonging to Sera Monastery. It is located north of Lhasa, in the Dodé Valley.

Footnotes
The Tibetan and Himalayan Library

Buddhist hermitages in Lhasa
Sera Monastery
Chengguan District, Lhasa